Harish-Chandra Mehrotra FRS (11 October 1923 – 16 October 1983) was an Indian American mathematician and physicist who did fundamental work in representation theory, especially harmonic analysis on semisimple Lie groups.

Early life
Harish-Chandra Mehrotra was born in Kanpur. He was educated at B.N.S.D. College, Kanpur and at the University of Allahabad. After receiving his master's degree in Physics in 1943, he moved to the Indian Institute of Science, Bangalore for further studies under Homi J. Bhabha.

In 1945, he moved to University of Cambridge, and worked as a research student under Paul Dirac. While at Cambridge, he attended lectures by Wolfgang Pauli, and during one of them pointed out a mistake in Pauli's work. The two were to become lifelong friends. During this time he became increasingly interested in mathematics. At Cambridge he obtained his PhD in 1947.

Honors and awards

He was a member of the National Academy of Sciences and a Fellow of the Royal Society. He was the recipient of the Cole Prize of the American Mathematical Society, in 1954. The Indian National Science Academy honoured him with the Srinivasa Ramanujan Medal in 1974. In 1981, he received an honorary degree from Yale University.

The mathematics department of V.S.S.D. College, Kanpur celebrates his birthday every year in different forms, which includes lectures from students and professors from various colleges, institutes and students' visit to Harish-Chandra Research Institute.

The Indian Government named the Harish-Chandra Research Institute, an institute dedicated to Theoretical Physics and Mathematics, after him.

Robert Langlands wrote in a biographical article of Harish-Chandra:

He was also a recipient of the Padma Bhushan in 1977.

References

Publications

Bibliography

External links
 
 Biography by Roger Howe

1923 births
1983 deaths
20th-century American mathematicians
People from Kanpur
University of Allahabad alumni
Alumni of Gonville and Caius College, Cambridge
Fellows of the Royal Society
Fellows of the Indian National Science Academy
Members of the United States National Academy of Sciences
Institute for Advanced Study faculty
Indian emigrants to the United States
20th-century Indian mathematicians
20th-century Indian physicists
Indian theoretical physicists
Recipients of the Padma Bhushan in literature & education
Indian Institute of Science alumni
American academics of Indian descent
Scientists from Uttar Pradesh